Esko Olavi Toivonen, better known by his stage name Eemeli (28 June 1920 – 9 November 1987) was a Finnish actor, comedian and entertainer. He was dubbed "the Buster Keaton of Finland" due to his deadpan expression.

Filmography
 Suuri sävelparaati (1959)
 Yks' tavallinen Virtanen (1959)
 Oho, sanoi Eemeli (1960)
 Kaks' tavallista Lahtista (1960) 
 Kankkulan kaivolla (1960)
 Molskis, sanoi Eemeli, molskis! (1960)
 Mullin mallin (1961)
 Voi veljet, mikä päivä! (1961)
 ”Ei se mitään!” sanoi Eemeli (1962)
 Tup-akka-lakko (1980)

Discography

Singles
 Oho, sanoi Eemeli / Taas Rovaniemen markkinoilla (Rytmi R 6386, 1959)
 Humppafoksi / Sahara (Rytmi R 6418, 1960)
 Tanssit Tippavaarassa (Rytmi R 6465, 1961), B-side by Jorma Lyytinen and Pärre Förars
 Syntymäpäivät Tippavaarassa / Tippäjärven vesj (Rytmi R 6496, 1962)
 Tukkijätkän twist / Susijahti (Rytmi R 6510, 1962)
 Saukkosen avioero (Rytmi R 6524, 1962), B-side by Ragni Malmsten
 Eemelin saunassa / Onko sulla sellaista (Fontana 271560, 1963), with Repe Helismaa
 Humppa humppa humppa tättärää / Palokuntajuhlat (Rytmi R 6546, 1964)
 Eemeli ja torvi (Rytmi R 6551, 1964), B-side by Tapio Rautavaara
 Eemeli ja Severi / Eemelin heilat (Rytmi R 6563, 1966), with Esa Pakarinen
 Kovat paikat 1 / Kovat paikat 2 (Rytmi R 6572, 1967)
 Mustalaisromanssi / Tytön tavarat (Rytmi RM 101, 1968)
 Syntymäpäivät / Vähän ennen kymmentä (Odeon 5E 006 34233, 1970)
 Vaarin luona / Myyrä (Odeon 5E 006 34413, 1971)
 Mulla menee hitaasti / Sisään vaan (JP-Musiikki JPS 1031, 1980)

EPs 
 Eemelin Eepee (Rytmi RN 4158, 1958)
 Kolme Eemeliä (Rytmi RN 4166, 1959)
 Oho, sanoi Eemeli (Rytmi RN 4210, 1960)
 Kotimaisia elokuvasävelmiä 4: Kankkulan kaivolla (Rytmi RN 4216, 1960)
 Repe & Eemeli (Rytmi RN 4220, 1960)
 Huumoria: Repe & Eemeli (Rytmi RN 4241, 1962)
 Huumoria 2: Repe & Eemeli (Rytmi RN 4250, 1962)

Albums  
 Eemeli (Sävel SÄLP 630, 1966)
 Eemeli Pinnalla (Columbia 5E 06234097, 1970)
 Esa & Eemeli (Rytmi RILP 7092, 1972)
 Eemelin joulukierre (Odeon 5E 05434730, 1972)
 Eemeli (Mars MK 166, 1981, as cassette)
 20 suosikkia – Oho! sano Eemeli (compilation album)
 Tangolla päähän – Kootut levytykset 1970–1972 (2010, compilation album)

References

1920 births
1987 deaths
20th-century Finnish comedians
Finnish male comedians
Finnish male film actors